Lord Augustus FitzClarence (1 March 1805 – 14 June 1854), was the youngest illegitimate son of William IV of the United Kingdom and his long-time mistress Dorothea Jordan. Like his siblings, he had little contact with his mother after his parents separated in 1811.

Career
In 1829 Augustus was appointed a Chaplain of his father (then Duke of Clarence and St Andrews) and later that year he was presented with the vicarage of Mapledurham in Oxfordshire, succeeding John Sumner (later Bishop of Chester and Archbishop of Canterbury). King William IV was a lavish benefactor of the church and the parish and, among his gifts was the clock in the tower which bears his initials, ″W R.″; he also made generous contributions to extend the vicarage and to enclose its adjacent grounds with substantial provisions for the foundation of a new school in the village. The marvellous collection of silver gilt communion plate presented to the church by Lord Augustus shortly after his appointment was probably in turn a gift from his father.

In 1830 he was appointed Chaplain in ordinary to his father (now King William IV), and on 24 May 1831 was granted the rank of a marquess' younger son, being appointed Chaplain to Queen Adelaide after his father's accession to the throne in 1832. Following his studies at Trinity College, Cambridge, he received the degrees of LL.B. (2 June 1832) and LL.D. (6 July 1835).

Marriage and issue
On 2 January 1845 he married Sarah Elizabeth Catharine Gordon (1827–1901), a daughter of Maj. Lord Henry Gordon (a younger brother of Charles Gordon, 10th Marquess of Huntly and a relative of the husband of his sister Lady Augusta Gordon) by his wife Louisa Payne. By his wife he had six children:
 Dorothea FitzClarence (1845–1870), who married Thomas William Goff, MP for Roscommon, and had issue.
 Eva FitzClarence (1847–1918). 
 Beatrice FitzClarence (1847–1909), a twin with Eva.
 Augustus FitzClarence (1849–1861), who died young.
 Henry Edward FitzClarence (1853–1930), who married Mary Isabel Templer Parsons and had issue.
 Mary FitzClarence (1854–1858), who was born posthumously and who died in infancy.

Death
FitzClarence died on 14 June 1854. His widow lived until 23 March 1901.

Ancestry

References

Illegitimate children of William IV of the United Kingdom
1805 births
1854 deaths
Augustus
Younger sons of marquesses
Sons of kings